Papus is a pseudonym of the Spanish-born French physician and hypnotist Gérard Encausse, founder of the modern Martinist Order.

Papus may also refer to:

 El Papus, Spanish satirical magazine published between 1973 and 1987
 a Roman family name, see Aemilia gens § Aemilii Papi
 Quintus Aemilius Papus (3rd century BC), a Roman general and statesman
 Lucius Aemilius Papus (3rd century BC), a Roman general and statesman
 Marcus Aemilius Papus (2nd century BC), a Roman senator who held a series of offices in the emperor's service
 Protilema papus, an Indonesian species of beetle in the family Cerambycidae, first described in 2010

See also
 Pappus (disambiguation)